Sound art is an artistic activity in which sound is utilized as a primary medium or material. Like many genres of contemporary art, sound art may be interdisciplinary in nature, or be used in hybrid forms. According to Brandon LaBelle, sound art as a practice "harnesses, describes, analyzes, performs, and interrogates the condition of sound and the process by which it operates."

In Western art, early examples include Luigi Russolo's Intonarumori or noise intoners (1913), and subsequent experiments by dadaists, surrealists, the Situationist International, and in Fluxus events and other Happenings. Because of the diversity of sound art, there is often debate about whether sound art falls within the domains of visual art or experimental music, or both. Other artistic lineages from which sound art emerges are conceptual art, minimalism, site-specific art, sound poetry, electro-acoustic music, spoken word, avant-garde poetry, sound scenography, and experimental theatre.

Origin of term
According to Bernhard Gál's research, the first published use of the term was found in Something Else Press on the cover of their 1974 Yearbook. The first use as the title of an exhibition at a major museum was 1979's "Sound Art" at the Museum of Modern Art in New York (MoMA), featuring Maggi Payne, Connie Beckley, and Julia Heyward. The curator, Barbara London defined sound art as, "more closely allied to art than to music, and are usually presented in the museum, gallery, or alternative space."

Commenting on an exhibition called "Sound/Art" at The Sculpture Center in New York City in 1984 art historian Don Goddard noted: "It may be that sound art adheres to curator Hellermann's perception that 'hearing is another form of seeing,' that sound has meaning only when its connection with an image is understood...The conjunction of sound and image insists on the engagement of the viewer, forcing participation in real space and concrete, responsive thought, rather than illusionary space and thought."

Sound installation

Sound installation is an intermedia and time-based art form. It is an expansion of an art installation in the sense that it includes the sound element and therefore the time element. The main difference with a sound sculpture is that a sound installation has a three-dimensional space and the axes with which the different sound objects are being organized are not exclusively internal to the work, but also external. A work of art is an installation only if it makes a dialog with the surrounding space. A sound installation is usually site-specific, but sometimes it can be readapted to other spaces. It can be made either in closed or open spaces, and context is fundamental in determining how a sound installation will be aesthetically perceived.
The difference between a regular art installation and a sound installation is that the latter contains a time element, which gives the visiting public the option to stay longer to explore the development of the sound over time. This temporal factor also gives the audience an incentive to explore the space more thoroughly and investigate the disposition of the different sounds in space.

Sound installations sometimes use interactive art technology (computers, sensors, mechanical and kinetic devices, etc.), but they can also simply use sound sources placed at different points in space (such as  speakers), or acoustic instrument materials such as piano strings played by a performer or by the public (see Paul Panhuysen). In the context of museums, this combination of interactive technology and multi-channel speaker distribution is sometimes referred to as sound scenography.

Sound structure in sound installations

The simplest sound form is a repeating sound loop. This is mostly used in Ambient music-like art, and in this case the sound is not the determinant factor of the art work.
The most used sound structure is the open form, since the public can decide to experience a sound installation for just a few minutes or for a longer period of time. This obliges the artist to construct a sound organization that is capable of working well in both cases.
There is also the possibility to have a linear sound structure, where sound develops in the same way as in a musical composition.

Sound sculpture
Sound sculpture is an intermedia and time-based art form in which sculpture or any kind of art object produces sound, or the reverse (in the sense that sound is manipulated in such a way as to create a sculptural as opposed to temporal form or mass). Most often sound sculpture artists were primarily either visual artists or composers, not having started out directly making sound sculpture.

Cymatics and kinetic art have influenced sound sculpture. Sound sculpture is sometimes site-specific.

Sound Artist and Professor of Art at Claremont Graduate University Michael Brewster described his own works as "Acoustic Sculptures" as early as 1970. Grayson described sound sculpture in 1975 as "the integration of visual form and beauty with magical, musical sounds through participatory experience."

Sound sculptures with Wikipedia articles
 Blackpool High Tide Organ
 Gesundheit Radio
 Sea organ
 Singing Ringing Tree (Panopticons)
 A Sound Garden
 Golden Gate Bridge#Wind

Gallery

See also

Notes

References
Kenneth Goldsmith, Duchamp Is My Lawyer: The Polemics, Pragmatics, and Poetics of UbuWeb, Columbia University Press, New York
Kahn, Douglas. 2001. Noise, Water, Meat: A History of Sound in the Arts. Cambridge: MIT Press. .
Licht, Alan. 2007. Sound Art: Beyond Music, Between Categories (with accompanying compact disc recording). New York: Rizzoli International Publications.  .
Peter Szendy. 2008. Listen: A History of Our Ears, Fordham University Press
Brandon LaBelle. 2006. Background Noise: Perspectives on Sound Art, London & New York: Continuum. .

Further reading

Attali, Jacques. 1985. Noise: The Political Economy of Music, translated by Brian Massumi, foreword by Fredric Jameson, afterword by Susan McClary. Minneapolis: University of Minnesota Press.  (cloth)  (pbk.)
Bandt, Ros. 2001. Sound Sculpture: Intersections in Sound and Sculpture in Australian Artworks. Sydney: Craftsman House. .
Cage, John. 1961. "Silence: Lectures and Writings". Middletown, CT: Wesleyan University Press. (Paperback reprint edition 1973)
Cox, Christoph. 2003. "Return to Form: Christoph Cox on Neo-modernist Sound Art—Sound—Column." Artforum (November): [pages].
Cox, Christoph. 2009. "Sound Art and the Sonic Unconscious". Organised Sound 14, no. 1:19–26.
Cox, Christoph. 2011. "Beyond Representation and Signification: Toward a Sonic Materialism". Journal of Visual Culture 10, no. 2:145–161.
Cox, Christoph, and Daniel Warner (eds.). 2004. Audio Culture: Readings in Modern Music. New York: Continuum. .
Drobnick, Jim (ed.). 2004. Aural Cultures. Toronto: YYZ Books; Banff: Walter Phillips Gallery Editions. .
Groth, Sanne Krogh, and Holger Schulze (eds.). 2020. The Bloomsbury Handbook of Sound Art. New York: Bloomsbury. .
Hegarty, Paul. 2007. Noise Music: A History. New York: Continuum International Publishing Group.  (hardcover)  (pbk)

Kim-Cohen, Seth. 2009. In the Blink of an Ear: Toward a Non-Cochlear Sonic Art. New York: Continuum. 
LaBelle, Brandon. 2006. Background Noise: Perspectives on Sound Art. New York and London: The Continuum International Publishing Group.  (cloth)  (pbk)
Lander, Dan, and Micah Lexier (eds.). 1990. Sound by Artists. Toronto: Art Metropole/Walter Phillips Gallery.
Lucier, Alvin, and Douglas Simon. 1980. Chambers. Middletown, Connecticut: Wesleyan University Press. .
Nechvatal, Joseph. 2000. "Towards a Sound Ecstatic Electronica". The Thing.
Oliveros, Pauline. 1984. Software for People. Baltimore: Smith Publications.  (cloth)  (pbk)
Paik, Nam June. 1963. "Post Music Manifesto," Videa N Videology. Syracuse, New York: Everson Museum of Art.
Peer, René van. 1993. Interviews with Sound Artists. Eindhoven: Het Apollohuis.
Rogers, Holly. 2013. Sounding the Gallery: Video and the Rise of Art-Music. Oxford: Oxford University Press.
Schaefer, Janek, Bryan Biggs, Christoph Cox, and Sara-Jayne Parsons. 2012. "Janek Schaefer: Sound Art: A Retrospective". Liverpool: The Bluecoat. .
Schafer, R. Murray. 1977. The Soundscape. Rochester, Vermont: Destiny Books. 
Schulz, Berndt (ed.). 2002. Resonanzen: Aspekte der Klangkunst. Heidelberg: Kehrer. . (Parallel text in German and English)
Skene, Cameron. 2007. "Sonic Boom". The Montreal Gazette (13 January).
Toop, David. 2004. Haunted Weather: Music, Silence, and Memory. London: Serpent's Tail.  (cloth),  (pbk.)
Valbonesi, Ilari. A.A.A.A.A.A.A. Cercasi Sound Art. ARTE E CRITICA, ISSUE 64, (2010)
Wilson, Dan. 2011. "Sonics in the Wildernesses – A Justification." The Brooklyn Rail (April)
Wishart, Trevor. 1996. On Sonic Art, new and revised edition, edited by Simon Emmerson (with accompanying compact disc recording). Contemporary Music Studies 12. Amsterdam: Harwood Academic Publishers.  (cloth)  (pbk.)  (CD recording)

 
Visual arts genres
Contemporary art
Visual music
Digital art
New media art
Experimental music genres
Audio works
Cassette culture 1970s–1990s